General elections were held in Japan on 20 February 1932. They were the last elections before the May 15 Incident, which marked the temporary end of party politics in Japan. Rikken Seiyūkai won 301 of the 466 seats in the House of Representatives.

Background
In 1931, the ruling Rikken Minseitō opposed the Mukden Incident, which was engineered by the military. The anti-war Foreign Minister Kijuro Shidehara and Prime Minister Wakatsuki Reijirō were criticized for their intervention in military and was accused of "serious corruption".  After the resignation of the Reijirō Cabinet, some right-wing members of the ruling party formed a coalition with the opposition Rikken Seiyūkai and elected Inukai Tsuyoshi as prime minister.

Before the elections, some businessmen and candidates were assassinated by the right-wing.

Results
Despite assassinations of anti-war politicians, Rikken Minseitō was unpopular because of its mishandling of the economic crisis. The ruling right-wing Rikken Seiyūkai led by Prime Minister Inukai Tsuyoshi won a landslide victory.

By prefecture

References

General elections in Japan
Japan
1932 elections in Japan
Politics of the Empire of Japan
February 1932 events
Election and referendum articles with incomplete results